The Banyoles monster is a legendary monster, possibly a dragon, from the Lake of Banyoles in Catalonia.

Legend
According to the legend, the Banyoles monster lives in the Banyoles Lake in Girona of northern eastern Spain hundreds years of ago. In the eighth century, a French monk named St. Emeterio coaxed the beast from the lake using prayers and transformed the creature into a peaceful herbivore. It is said the Banyoles Monster still lives in the depth of the lake today.

In popular culture
The monster is the subject of a 2008 children's song "El Monstre De Banyoles" by Toni Jiménez.

References

Links
 

Catalan legendary creatures
Catalan mythology